BW Businessworld is an Indian business magazine owned by media entrepreneur Anurag Batra. The magazine was published by ABP Group, whose most prominent publications are The Telegraph, Anandabazar Patrika, Sananda, Anandamela and others.  On 19 September 2013 ABP Group owners Ananda Publishers sold Businessworld to Anurag Batra, owner of media group exchange4media, and Vikram Jhunjhunwala, who runs investment banking and asset management firm Shrine Capital for an undisclosed amount.

BW Businessworld offices are located in New Delhi, Mumbai, Bangalore and Chennai.

The magazine was founded in 1981. In the year 2021, the publication was in news for unpaid news to its editorial staff.

Their publications are BW Police World, BW Defence, BW Legal World, BW Marketing World

Chairman
Annurag Batra, also known as Anurag Batra, an Indian journalist and author, is the chairman and editor in chief of Businessworld and Exchange4media and also a member of the board of governors of the Management Development Institute (MDI).

Career
Anurag Batra acquired Businessworld from the ABP Group in 2013. All India Council of Technical Education (AICTE), a statutory body of the Government of India, has appointed Dr. Anurag Batra as a member of the board of governors of the Management Development Institute (MDI), Gurgaon.

References

External links
Official website 

1981 establishments in Delhi
Biweekly magazines published in India
Business magazines published in India
English-language magazines published in India
Magazines established in 1981
Magazines published in Delhi